The 1947 Hardin–Simmons Cowboys football team was an American football team that represented Hardin–Simmons University in the Border Conference during the 1947 college football season.  In its fourth season under head coach Warren B. Woodson, the team compiled an 8–3 record (5–1 against conference opponents) and outscored all opponents by a total of 305 to 87. The team played its three home games at Fair Park Stadium in Abilene, Texas.

Schedule

References

Hardin-Simmons
Hardin–Simmons Cowboys football seasons
Hardin-Simmons Cowboys football